The Japan Intellectual Property Association (JIPA) is a non-profit, non-governmental organization representing "industries and users of the intellectual property (IP) system". It was established in 1938. It claims to be the largest private organization in Japan concerned with intellectual property rights, with more than one thousand members as of 2009.

See also
 Japanese patent law
 Japan Patent Office

References

External links
 Japan Intellectual Property Association web site (English)

1938 establishments in Japan
Intellectual property organizations